Chorfa is a town in north-eastern Algeria.

Communes of Annaba Province
Annaba Province